Kalininsky or Kalininskyi District may refer to:
Kalininsky District, Russia, name of several districts and city districts in Russia
 Kalininskyi District, Donetsk, an urban district in Ukraine
 Kalininskyi District, Horlivka, an urban district in Ukraine

See also
 Kalinin (disambiguation)
 Kalininsk (disambiguation)
 Kalininsky (disambiguation)

District name disambiguation pages